Cellulosilyticum ruminicola  is a Gram-negative, obligate anaerobic, mesophilic, cellulolytic and non-motile bacterium from the genus of Cellulosilyticum which has been isolated from the rumen of a yak.

References

External links
Type strain of Cellulosilyticum ruminicola at BacDive -  the Bacterial Diversity Metadatabase

Lachnospiraceae
Bacteria described in 2010